Govind Nagar Assembly constituency is one of 403 legislative assemblies of the Uttar Pradesh. It is part of the Kanpur Lok Sabha constituency.

Overview
Govindnagar comprises Armapur Estate (CT), Wards No.  11, 19, 22, 37, 42, 48, 49, 50, 59, 60, 61, 80, 85, 92, and 101 in Kanpur Municipal Corporation of 2-Kanpur Sadar Tehsil.

Members of Legislative Assembly

 *By Election

Election results

2022

2019

2017

2012

2007

2002

1996

1993

1991

1989

1985

 
|-
! style="background-color:#E9E9E9" align=left width=225|Party
! style="background-color:#E9E9E9" align=right|Seats won
! style="background-color:#E9E9E9" align=right|Seat change
|-
|align=left|Bharatiya Janata Party
| align="center" | 2
| align="center" | 1
|-
|align=left|Samajwadi Party
| align="center" | 2
| align="center" | 1
|-
|align=left|Indian National Congress
| align="center" | 1
| align="center" | 0
|-
|}

See also
 List of Vidhan Sabha constituencies of Uttar Pradesh

References

External links
 

Politics of Kanpur
Assembly constituencies of Uttar Pradesh